Michael John (1925-2013) was the inaugural Bishop of East Kerala of the Church of South India:

John was born in 1925 at Valakom. He was educated at Serampore University and Union Presbyterian Seminary. John was ordained in 1953.He served in Cherthala,  Ranni, Alappuzha, Olassa and Kottayam. He also served in Kuwait and Canada. He died in 2013.

Notes

 

 

20th-century Anglican bishops in India
Senate of Serampore College (University) alumni
Union Presbyterian Seminary alumni
Church of South India clergy
Indian bishops
Indian Christian religious leaders
Anglican bishops of East Kerala
2013 deaths
1925 births